Drywood or Dry Wood may refer to:

Dry Wood, Kansas
Drywood Township, Bourbon County, Kansas
Drywood, Wisconsin
Camp Drywood
Drywood Formation

See also
Wood drying